Zero: Fever Part.3 is the seventh extended play (EP) by South Korean boy group Ateez. It was released on September 13, 2021, with "Deja Vu" and "Eternal Sunshine" serving as lead singles. The physical album comes in three versions: A, Diary, and Z. The EP is composed of six tracks.

Commercially, Zero: Fever Part.3 received over 810,000 pre-orders, which was more than the double of their previous release, Zero: Fever Part.2. The EP debuted at number one on Billboard's World Albums Chart and the group reached a new peak on Billboard's World Digital Songs Chart with "Deja Vu" at number four. It also marked Ateez's first appearance on the Billboard 200, with the EP debuting at number 42. Ateez also topped the Billboard Emerging Artists Chart after the album release. The album was certified double platinum with over 737,000 physical sales in South Korea in 2021.

Release and promotion 
On September 13, Zero: Fever Part.3 was officially released worldwide. The lead single, "Deja Vu", was voted on by fans in competition with track "Eternal Sunshine". On the same day, a media showcase was held and an online fan showcase was live-streamed on Universe. Ateez began their music program promotion with live performances of lead single “Deja Vu” and sidetrack “Not Too Late” starting from M! Countdown on September 16. They continued on with performances on Music Bank, Show! Music Core, Inkigayo, The Show and Show Champion. On September 22, they received their sixth music show win on Show Champion with "Deja Vu". Ateez also made other television appearances to promote the album, performing “Deja Vu” and “Not Too Late” on MBC M's Weekly Idol and KBS' You Hee-yeol's Sketchbook. They guested on radio shows including KBS Cool FM's Kiss the Radio and Volume Up.

On October 4, the music video of the other title song “Eternal Sunshine” was uploaded. Ateez began another round of promotion on music programs with the single starting from October 7’s M! Countdown. On October 31, a Halloween version performance video of “Deja Vu” was released, in tradition of their annual Halloween performance since 2018.

Track listing

Charts

Weekly charts

Monthly charts

Year-end charts

Accolades

Certifications

References

2021 EPs
Ateez albums
K-pop EPs